The Wide-Field Imager for Solar Probe (WISPR) is an imaging instrument of the Parker Solar Probe mission to the Sun, launched in August 2018. Imaging targets include visible light images of the corona, solar wind, shocks, solar ejecta, etc. Development of WISPR was led by the  U.S. Naval Research Laboratory. The Parker Solar Probe with WISPR on board was launched by a Delta IV Heavy on 12 August 2018 from Cape Canaveral, Florida. WISPR is intended take advantage of the spacecraft's proximity to the Sun by taking coronagraph-style images of the solar corona and features like coronal streamers, plumes, and mass ejections. One of the goals is to better understand the structure of the solar corona near the Sun.

WISPR is designed to study the electron density and velocity structure of the corona. The instrument field of view is planned to extend from 13 to 108 degrees away from the Sun, and does not directly image the Sun; the area of interest is a very wide field extending away from the Sun.

WISPR includes two separate telescopes, each with a radiation-hardened CMOS imager with resolution of 2,048×1,920 pixels. The CMOS sensors are an active pixel sensor type of detector.

The WISPR first light image was published in September 2018. In December, a view of the corona including a coronal streamer was released.

In November 2018, a video of WIPSR recording solar wind during the spacecraft's first close pass to the Sun was released. One project scientist noted, "The data we’re seeing from Parker Solar Probe’s instruments is showing us details about solar structures and processes that we have never seen before,"

Development 
The stray light and baffle for WISPR was modeled during development of the instrument. Two noted cases where stray material caused issue with space imaging includes the Infrared Telescope (IRT) flown on the Space Shuttle Spacelab-2 mission, in which a piece of mylar insulation broke loose and floated into the line-of-sight of the telescope corrupting data. This was on the STS-51-F in the year 1985. Another case was in the 2010s on the Gaia spacecraft for which some stray light was identified coming from fibers of the sunshield, protruding beyond the edges of the shield.

Gallery

See also
FIELDS
IS☉IS
SWEAP

References

External links
Looking at the Corona with WISPR on Parker Solar Probe (April 16, 2018)

Parker Solar Probe
Space imagers
Solar telescopes